Fate/Zero is a Japanese light novel written by Gen Urobuchi, illustrated by Takashi Takeuchi, and is a prequel to all routes in Type-Moon's visual novel, Fate/stay night.

Fate/Zero is set ten years before the events of Fate/stay night, and tells the story of the Fourth Holy Grail War, a secret magical tournament held in Fuyuki City, Japan, where seven mages known as Masters summon Servants, reincarnations of legendary souls and heroes from all across time, where they fight in a deadly battle royale where the winner obtains the Holy Grail, a legendary magical chalice capable of granting wishes. The main protagonist, Kiritsugu Emiya, the foster father of Fate/stay night protagonist, Shirou Emiya, is known as a ruthless assassin who joins the tournament on behalf of his wife's family, the Einzberns.

An anime adaptation was produced by Ufotable, the first season of which aired from October 1 to December 24, 2011, and the second season of which aired from April 7 to June 23, 2012. A manga adaptation was published by Kadokawa Shoten between 2011 and 2017. Dark Horse Comics licensed the manga and released it in English in North America.

Fate/Zero  was praised for its animation, themes, characters, soundtrack, and story. The series has also been a commercial success, selling over 40,000 BD box-set and winning several awards at the Newtype Anime Awards, including "Title of the Year".

Plot

The story of Fate/Zero takes place ten years prior to the events of Fate/stay night, detailing the events of the Fourth Holy Grail War in Fuyuki City. The Holy Grail War is a contest, founded by the Einzbern, Matou, and Tohsaka families centuries ago, in which seven mages summon seven Heroic Spirits to compete and obtain the power of the "Holy Grail", which grants a wish to each member of the winning duo.  After three inconclusive wars for the elusive Holy Grail, the Fourth War commences.

The Einzbern family is determined to achieve victory in the Fourth War after three consecutive failures, no matter the cost. As a result, they have elected to bring the notorious "mage killer," Kiritsugu Emiya, into their ranks, despite his methods and reputation as a skilled mercenary and a hitman who employs all means necessary to accomplish his goals. Though Kiritsugu had once wanted to become a hero who could save everyone, he has long since abandoned this ideal upon realizing that saving one person often comes at the cost of another's life. Thus, this is the source of conflict he once sought to eliminate due to finite resources/abilities. For the sake of humanity, he resolves to ruthlessly destroy anything and anyone who threatens the peace of others.

However, Kiritsugu finds himself deeply torn between the love he has found for his new family – his wife Irisviel and their daughter Illya – and what he must do to obtain the Holy Grail. Meanwhile, Kiritsugu's greatest opponent appears in the form of Kirei Kotomine, a priest. The latter is trying to discover his true nature in his quest to find the Holy Grail, which is revealed to be monstrous and full of hate. He sets his sights on Kiritsugu as a kindred spirit and possible answer to the emptiness he feels.

Towards the conclusion, the limitations of the "Holy Grail" are found to be in the fact that, while omnipotent in its wish-granting abilities, it is not omniscient, and therefore depends on the victor's knowledge and methods to determine the way by which the wish is carried out. And, to make things worse, the last war fought over the Grail has corrupted it, causing any wish granted by the Grail to be a Monkey's Paw.

Production and publication
Writer Gen Urobuchi was pitched a prequel of Fate/stay night by Takashi Takeuchi. Despite the tragedy of the ending, the good ending in Fate/stay Night would not be affected because Kiritsugu's life was a prequel. Urobuchi planned the series to end by its fourth volume. Nasu was amazed by Urobuchi and had predicted in 2002 while unable to work on Fate/stay night due to illness that Urobuchi would write an interesting story. Ideas like Saber being lectured by Gilgamesh and Alexander the Great gave him a bigger impact. When starting the project for Fate/Zero, Nasu decided to give Urobuchi complete freedom for Kiritsugu's characterization.

The idea of Fate/Zero was proposed by Urobuchi. Urobuchi explained that 90% of the proposals were accepted by Nasu. In Fate/stay night, Saber explains she had brief interactions with Kiritsugu Emiya which led to the creation of the character of Irisviel. As Kiritsugu's wife, Irisviel plays the role of facilitating communication between these two, who do not talk to each other. The distanced and ultimately dark relationship between Kiritsugu and Saber caused by the former's actions in the story led Urobuchi and Nasu to change some early drafts in the story, including the addition of Kiritsugu adopting Shirou. These changes were to create a more coherent relationship between Saber and Shirou Emiya in the original visual novel. Nasu was in charge of the use of magic rather than attempting to use real occultism. Urobuchi had difficulty ending the novels as he wanted to distance it from typical stories, but in the end decided to follow his own style. Urobuchi had no issues writing the main characters' ideologies.

The first volume was released on December 29, 2006, as a collaboration between Type-Moon and fellow developer Nitroplus. The second volume was released on March 31, 2007. The third volume was released on July 27, 2007. The fourth and final volume was released on December 29, 2007, along with the Fate/Zero Original Image Soundtrack "Return to Zero". Fate/Zero began as a light novel series written by Urobuchi with illustrations by Takashi Takeuchi. It is set as a prequel to Type-Moon's visual novel Fate/stay night.

Related media

Drama CD
Four sets of drama CDs were released from 2008 to 2010. A soundtrack entitled Return to Zero was released on December 31, 2007.

Following the airing of the anime adaption, drama CDs written by Urobuchi were bundled with the series' Blu-Ray box sets released from 2011 to 2012.

Anime

The anime adaptation was approved for production by December 2010. It was produced by studio Ufotable and began airing in October 2011. Fate/Zero is the third anime production in the Fate series, following the 24-episode 2006 adaptation and the 2010 Unlimited Blade Works film. Nico Nico Douga and Aniplex simulcasted Fate/Zero worldwide with eight different language subtitles, including Korean, Chinese (traditional and simplified), English, French, German, Italian, and Spanish.

The anime was originally slated to run continuously for all episodes, but was later given a season break between 13 and 14 to allow for better animation. The first season ran from October 1 to December 24, 2011, and the second season ran from April 7 to June 23, 2012. For the first cour, the opening theme is "oath sign" by LiSA and the ending theme is "Memoria" by Aoi Eir. The series was licensed in North America by Aniplex of America and featured an English dub which ran on Viz Media's Neon Alley service.

Manga
The manga adaptation illustrated by Shinjirō was serialized in Young Ace between December 29, 2010, and June 2, 2017, compiled in fourteen volumes. In September 2014, Dark Horse Comics announced that they had licensed the manga. They released eight volumes from 2016 to 2019. A parody manga, Fate/Zero Kuro by mendori was serialized in 2011 and 2012 in Altima Ace and then Monthly Asuka and compiled into one volume in 2013.

Other
An art book entitled Fate/Zero material was released on August 8, 2008. Published by Type-Moon, the book contains a compilation of the published and promotional art from the novel, detailed character profiles and memo sections, and an overview of the novel's plot. Two video game adaptations for smartphones, Fate/Zero The Adventure and Fate/Zero Next Encounter, were released in Japan. In 2016, a special event entitled Fate/Accel Zero Order was held from 27 April to 11 May. The scenario was written by Gen Urobuchi and the animation was produced by ufotable.

Reception

Critical reception
Fate/Zero received critical acclaim. Jacob Chapman of Anime News Network highly praised the series, describing it as "a treasure worth unearthing to its end" and concluded by writing: "Ambitious, brilliant, heartbreaking and masterfully crafted narrative, complex characters with powerful ideals, visually stunning, gorgeous score and strong cast in both languages." Elliot Gay of Japanator was impressed by its pilot episode despite serving as an exposition for the masters, who he felt were more appealing than the ones from the original series thanks to Ufotable's work.

UK Anime Network'''s Martin gave the first part a score 9 out of 10, and the second part a perfect score of 10 out of 10. Martin characterized the story as very dark and demanding and "a dramatic and satisfying conclusion to a solidly entertaining series." T.H.E.M. Anime Reviews gave the entire series a score of 4 out of 5 stars, with reviewer Aiden Foote believing Fate/Zero as "one of the most visually impressive TV series to date" and praised the "smooth animation and consistent artwork coming together to make crisp, evocative action scenes to get the heart racing." Aiden also stated "the main reason why I really like the show is the time and effort that Urobuchi puts into the majority of the characters." However, Aiden also criticizes the pacing stating that series' biggest problem was the "plot pacing".

Richard Eisenbeis of Kotaku praised the animation, themes and the characters backstories especially Kiritsugu's. Richard started the review by writing "Gen Urobuchi has written some of the most psychologically dark anime in recent memory. He is a master at subverting anime tropes to breathe new life into stale genres." His final thoughts being "Fate/Zero is an excellent anime.” It has dynamic, multifaceted characters, explores great philosophies and themes, and tops it off with large helpings of action. It also has the will to go deep into dark, psychological territory to improve both its characters and story."

Sales and accolades
The first season's BD box set sold 43,000 copies in its first week, the highest-selling anime television Blu-ray box in first week-sales until then, breaking the record previously held by Haruhi Suzumiya. The second season's BD box set also topped Oricon's weekly sales, selling over 40,000 copies.Fate/Zero won multiple top prizes during the 2nd Newtype Anime Awards, including Title of the Year, Best Studio (for ufotable), Best Soundtrack, and Best CM. It placed second for Best Theme Song ("to the beginning"), Best Director, Best Character Design and Script. In the Best Male Character category, Rider placed first, Kiritsugu placed third and Gilgamesh placed eight. In Best Character for Female, Saber placed second. It received 2 nomination at the 2014 UK Anime Network Awards in Best action category and best dramatic anime category. The light novel took sixth place in its respective category in the 2015 Sugoi Japan Awards.

In 2019, Polygon named Fate/Zero as one of the best anime of the 2010s. Crunchyroll included the series among "Top 25 anime of the decade" list, with writer Azaly Zeldin calling it "one of the best anime series of the past decade". Zeldin wrote that the series is an "expensive, beautiful and smart action thriller that consolidated the glory of ufotable, Gen Urobuchi and Yuki Kajiura, and has become for the modern anime industry something similar to what The Dark Knight means for the current wave of comic book movies." Writing for Comic Book Resources, Sage Ashford ranked it #8 on his list, stating that the "series is so important it revitalized the [Fate] franchise in the world of anime, resulting in multiple series and films that have continued even into 2019." IGN also listed Fate/Zero among the best anime of the decade, praising the series for its "dark, mature tale that doesn’t shy away from sensitive material" and for "having some of the best animation that lauded studio Ufotable has ever produced. It perfectly sets the stage for Fate/Stay Night, but beyond that, it also stands on its own as the perfect entry point into the series." Thrillist'' named the series one of the best anime of the 2010s, with LB writing it's "tense and unforgiving; plus, there's some freaky bug magic that will surely get your skin crawling."

References

External links
 Type-Moon's Official Homepage for the Fate/stay night Game  
 Type-Moon's and Nitroplus' Official Homepage for Fate/Zero 
 Official Anime Website 
 Official US Website
 

2006 Japanese novels
2011 anime television series debuts
2011 manga
Action anime and manga
Anime and manga based on light novels
Anime composed by Yuki Kajiura
Aniplex
Cultural depictions of Arthurian legend
Dark fantasy anime and manga
Dark Horse Comics titles
Fiction about death games
Fate/stay night anime
Fate/stay night manga
Fate/stay night novels
Fiction set in 1994
Light novels
Nitroplus
Seinen manga
Type-Moon
Ufotable